The Overton Hoard is a Roman coin hoard dating from the early 3rd century AD. It contains 37 coins and fragments of a pottery container. It was acquired by the Yorkshire Museum in 2018.

Discovery
The hoard was found by a metal detectorist on 21 September 2016 in a field near Overton, North Yorkshire.

Contents
The hoard contains 37 silver coins all of which are denarii. They coins date from the reign of Domitian while he was junior Emperor under his father Vespasian (AD 69–79) to the reign of Septimius Severus. The latest coin in the hoard dates to AD 205. Despite the wide date range, the coins could all have still been in circulation together in the early 3rd century. They were probably deposited in a ceramic vessel, of which only fragments were found.

Gallery

Acquisition and display

After being declared treasure, the hoard was acquired by Yorkshire Museum in early 2018 and first went on public display in October 2018.

References

2016 in England
2016 archaeological discoveries
Treasure troves in England
Treasure troves of Roman Britain
Archaeological sites in North Yorkshire
Collections of the Yorkshire Museum
Hoards from Roman Britain
Coin hoards